Run-Time Abstraction Services (RTAS) is run-time firmware that provides abstraction to the operating systems running on IBM System i and IBM System p computers.

It contrasts with Open Firmware, in that the latter is usually used only during boot, while RTAS is used during run-time.

Firmware
IBM mainframe technology